Leucocyanidin is a colorless chemical compound that is a member of the class of natural products known as leucoanthocyanidins.

Chemistry 
(+)-Leucocyanidin can be synthesized from (+)-dihydroquercetin by reduction with sodium borohydride.

Molar equivalents of synthetic (2R,3S,4R or S)-leucocyanidin and (+)-catechin condense with exceptional rapidity at pH 5 under ambient conditions to give the all-trans-[4,8]- and [4,6]-bi-[(+)-catechins] (procyanidins B3, B6) the all-trans-[4,8:4,8]- and [4,8:4,6]-tri-[(+)-catechins] (procyanidin C2  and isomer).

Metabolism 
Leucocyanidin oxygenase uses leucocyanidin, 2-oxoglutarate, and O2 to produce cis-dihydroquercetin, trans-dihydroquercetin (taxifolin), succinate, CO2, and H2O.
 
Leucoanthocyanidin reductase (LAR or leucocyanidin reductase LCR) uses (2R,3S)-catechin, NADP+, and H2O to produce 2,3-trans-3,4-cis-leucocyanidin, NADPH, and H+. Its gene expression has been studied in developing grape berries and grapevine leaves. Its activity has also been measured in leaves, flowers, and seeds of the legumes Medicago sativa, Lotus japonicus, Lotus uliginosus, Hedysarum sulfurescens, and Robinia pseudoacacia.

The C-4 stereochemistry of leucocyanidin substrates affects anthocyanidin synthase (ANS) products. This enzyme is an iron(II) and 2-oxoglutarate (2OG) dependent oxygenase.

Occurrence 
Leucoyanidin can be found in Aesculus hippocastanum (Horse chestnut), Anacardium occidentale (Cashew, acajou), Arachis hypogaea (peanut), Areca catechu (Areca nut), Asimina triloba (American custardapple), Cerasus vulgaris (Cherry), Cinnamomum camphora (Camphor), Erythroxylon coca (coca), Gleditsia triacanthos (Honey locust), Hamamelis virginiana (American Witch Hazel), Hippophae rhamnoides (Hippophae berry Sanddorn), Hordeum vulgare (Barley), Humulus lupulus (bine), Hypericum perforatum (perikon Amber), Laurus nobilis, Magnolia denudata (Hsin-I Yulan-Magnolie), Malva sylvestris (Blue mallow), Musa acuminata × balbisiana (Banana), Nelumbo nucifera (Baladi bean), Pinus strobus (Eastern white pine), Prunus serotina ssp. serotina (black cherry), Psidium guajava (Common guava), Quercus alba (White oak), Quercus robur (Common oak), Rumex hymenosepalus (Arizona dock), Schinus terebinthifolius (Brazilian pepper tree), Terminalia arjuna (arjun), Terminalia catappa (Indian almond), Theobroma cacao (Cacao), Drimia maritima (Sea Squill), Vicia faba (bell-bean), Vitis vinifera (common grape vine), Zea mays (corn, maize), and Ziziphus jujuba (jujube, Chinese date).

References 

Leucoanthocyanidins
Catechols
Resorcinols